Kalina Borislavova Konstantinova (Bulgarian: Калина Бориславова Константинова; born 18 May 1984) is a Bulgarian entrepreneur and politician.

Biography 
Kalina Kostantinova was born in Sofia, Bulgaria on 18 May 1984. She studied at Lycée Français de Sofia and after that graduated from Bard College specialising in Economics. Konstantinova holds a master's degree in Sustainable development from London School of Economics. . Deputy Minister of Economy In office
12 May 2021 – 16 September 2021 and Deputy Prime Minister for Effective Government in 
Government of Kiril Petkov in 13 December 2021 - 2 August 2022.

References 

1984 births
Living people
Bulgarian politicians
Bard College alumni
People from Sofia
Government ministers of Bulgaria
Deputy prime ministers of Bulgaria